Prem Maya Sonir (born July 14, 1961) is the Retired Sport Officer of North Eastern Railways Headquarters Gorakhpur. 

During the 1980 Olympics, she was one of the star members of India's hockey team which also included the Saini Sisters and Lorraine Fernandes where they defeated Austria and Poland. They came fourth missing out on a bronze medal.

She was a member of the women's hockey team of India, which won the gold medal in the 1982 Asian Games held in New Delhi.

She also serves as the coach of the Indian Railways women hockey team, which has won the women's national hockey championship a number of times. She was also the captain  of the national women's hockey team. She received the Arjuna Award in 1985.

References

sports-reference

External links

Indian female field hockey players
1961 births
Living people
Field hockey players at the 1980 Summer Olympics
Olympic field hockey players of India
Recipients of the Arjuna Award
20th-century Indian women
20th-century Indian people
Asian Games medalists in field hockey
Field hockey players at the 1982 Asian Games
Field hockey players at the 1986 Asian Games
Asian Games gold medalists for India
Asian Games bronze medalists for India
Medalists at the 1982 Asian Games
Medalists at the 1986 Asian Games